Tinariwen (Tamasheq: , with vowels , pronounced tinariwen "deserts", plural of ténéré "desert") is a collective of Tuareg musicians from the Sahara Desert region of northern Mali. Considered a pioneer of desert blues, the group's guitar-driven style combines traditional Tuareg and African music with Western rock music. They have released eight albums since their formation and have toured internationally.

The group was founded by Ibrahim Ag Alhabib, along with Alhassane Ag Touhami and brothers Inteyeden Ag Ablil and Liya Ag Ablil (aka "Diarra").
The as then unnamed musical group was formed in 1979 while exiled in Tamanrasset, Algeria. Tinariwen formed as a musical collective while in military training in Libya, aiming to write songs about issues facing the Tuareg people. They returned to Mali in 1989, with some members joining as fighters in a Tuareg rebellion before dedicating themselves to music full-time in 1991 after a peace accord was reached. Tinariwen first started to gain a following outside the Sahara region in 2001 with the release of the album The Radio Tisdas Sessions, and with performances at Festival au Désert in Mali and the Roskilde Festival in Denmark. Their popularity rose internationally with the release of the critically acclaimed album Aman Iman in 2007. Following the start of the Mali War in 2012, the group fled their home country and have since lived and recorded in exile due to threats against them from militant groups.

The group has been nominated Grammy Awards three times, and in 2012 Tassili won the award for Best World Music Album. NPR calls the group "music's true rebels", AllMusic deems the group's music "a grassroots voice of rebellion", and Slate calls the group "rock 'n' roll rebels whose rebellion, for once, wasn't just metaphorical".

Biography

Background
Musician Ibrahim Ag Alhabib, at the age of four, witnessed the execution of his father, a Tuareg rebel, during a 1963 uprising in Mali. After seeing a western film in which a cowboy played a guitar as a child, Ag Alhabib built his own guitar out of a "plastic water can, a stick and some fishing wire", according to future bandmate Abdallah Ag Alhousseyni. Ag Alhabib first lived in Algeria in refugee camps near Bordj Badji Mokhtar and in the deserts around the southern city of Tamanrasset, where he was given a guitar from a local Arab man.

Later, Ag Alhabib resided with other Tuareg exiles in Libya and Algeria. He acquired his first real acoustic guitar in 1979. During this period he formed a band with Alhassane Ag Touhami and brothers Inteyeden Ag Ablil and Liya Ag Ablil (aka "Diarra") to play at parties and weddings. While the group had no official name, people began to call them Kel Tinariwen, which in the Tamashek language translates as "The People of the Deserts" or "The Desert Boys".

In 1980 Libyan ruler Muammar al-Gaddafi put out a decree inviting all young Tuareg men who were living illegally in Libya to receive full military training. Gaddafi dreamed of forming a Saharan regiment, made up of young Tuareg fighters, to further his territorial ambitions in Chad, Niger, and elsewhere. Ag Alhabib and his bandmates answered the call and received nine months of training. During such exercises, the band met additional Tuareg musicians and formed a loosely-organized collective to create songs about the issues facing the Tuareg people. They built a makeshift studio and vowed to record music for free for anyone who supplied a blank cassette tape. The resulting homemade cassettes were traded widely throughout the Sahara region.

In 1989 the collective left Libya and moved to Ag Alhabib's home country of Mali, where he returned to his home village of Tessalit for the first time in 26 years. In 1990 the Tuareg people of Mali revolted against the government, with some of the musicians of the collective participating as rebel fighters. After a peace agreement known as the Tamanrasset Accords was reached in January 1991, the musicians left the rebel movement and devoted themselves to music full-time. In 1992 some of the members of Tinariwen went to Abidjan, Côte d'Ivoire, to record a cassette at JBZ studios. They played occasional gigs for far-flung Tuareg communities throughout the Sahara region, gaining word-of-mouth popularity among the Tuareg people.

1998–2009: international recognition

In 1993 Manny Ansar became the band's manager, after hearing them play when they were back in Mali. He started organising concerts for them in Bamako, initially just for fun with friends, but the realisation dawned that they had developed a new genre of music. This was the first time that Tuareg folk music had been adapted to be played with modern guitars, and their music was also influence by the blues of Ali Farka Touré and other artists. This made it more accessible to the rest of the world, and this exposure was appreciated by the Tuareg community. It was at this point that Tinariwen was created as a professional band. Initially they comprised around a dozen musicians, but this reduced to seven or eight, with the others creating their own groups. One of these was Terakaft.

In 1998 Tinariwen came to the attention of the French world music ensemble Lo'Jo and their manager Philippe Brix. That group travelled to a music festival in Bamako and met two members of the Tinariwen collective. In 1999, some members of Tinariwen travelled to France and performed with Lo'Jo under the name Azawad.

In January 2001, manager Manny Ansar organised the inaugural Festival au Désert, which took place in Tin Essako, in collaboration with Lo'Jo. Tinariwen headlined the festival, which was mounted in cooperation with the Belgian Sfinks Festival.

Their debut commercial album, The Radio Tisdas Sessions, was recorded by Justin Adams and Jean-Paul Romann at the radio station of the same name in Kidal, Mali (the only Tamashek-speaking station in the region) and released in 2001. It was Tinariwen's first recording to be released outside of northern Africa.

Since 2001 Tinariwen have toured regularly in Europe, North America, Japan, and Australia. Their 2004 album Amassakoul ("The Traveller" in Tamashek) and the 2007 album Aman Iman ("Water Is Life" in Tamashek) were released worldwide and gained the notice of celebrity fans including Carlos Santana, Robert Plant, Bono and the Edge of U2, Thom Yorke of Radiohead, Chris Martin of Coldplay, Henry Rollins, Brian Eno, and members of TV On The Radio. In 2005, Tinariwen received a BBC Award for World Music, and in 2008, they received Germany's prestigious Praetorius Music Prize. The band's 2009 album Imidiwan: Companions was recorded in a mobile studio by Jean-Paul Romann in the village of Tessalit, Mali. The band appeared at Glastonbury in 2009.

Also since 2001 the Tinariwen collective has added several younger Tuareg musicians who did not live through the military conflicts experienced by the older members but have contributed to the collective's multi-generational evolution. New members include bassist Eyadou Ag Leche, percussionist Said Ag Ayad, guitarist Elaga Ag Hamid, guitarist Abdallah Ag Lamida, and vocalists Wonou Walet Sidati and the Walet Oumar sisters.

2010–present

In 2010, Tinariwen represented Algeria in the opening ceremony of the 2010 FIFA World Cup in South Africa, and completed a lengthy American tour. The band released their fifth album Tassili on 30 August 2011. Tassili included guest appearances by Nels Cline, The Dirty Dozen Brass Band, and Tunde Adebimpe and Kyp Malone of TV on the Radio. Ian Brennan produced the album with engineer, Jean Paul Romman. The album later won the Award for Best World Music Album at the 54th Grammy Awards. In July 2011, the collective set out for a new world tour that included performances at the End of the Road Festival in September and All Tomorrow's Parties in December. Tinariwen appeared on The Colbert Report on 29 November 2011 with Adebimpe and Malone to play "Tenere Taqqim Tossam" and "Imidiwan Ma Tenam" from Tassili. Group members Ibrahim Ag Alhabib, Alhassane Ag Touhami, and Eyadou Ag Leche participated in a translated interview with Colbert.

They appeared at the January 2012 Festival au Désert, where they were joined on stage by Bono (of U2 fame) and Bassekou Kouyate. In early 2012 there was another Tuareg rebellion in Tinariwen's home region of northern Mali, with the National Movement for the Liberation of Azawad (MNLA) declaring independence and forming the short-lived unrecognized state Azawad. In August 2012, another party in the rebellion, the militant Islamist group Ansar Dine, denounced the presence of popular music in the territory, and Tinariwen was targeted specifically during this campaign.

The band was scheduled to play at WOMADelaide, in Adelaide, South Australia, in March 2012, as part of a tour to Australia, Hong Kong, and New Zealand. However, around a week before the festival, a change to the line-up was announced owing to the conflict in Mali. Ibrahim Ag Alhabib and Elaga Al Hamid were not able to get out of the country, with Ag Alhabib sheltering in a refugee camp near the Algerian border. Instead, members of Lo'Jo joined Tinariwen on stage at WOMADelaide.

In a January 2013 confrontation, most band members evaded capture, except Abdallah Ag Lamida who was abducted while trying to save his guitars. A few weeks later, Tinariwen reported that Ag Lamida had been released and was "safe and free".

During Ag Lamida's captivity, several other members of Tinariwen fled from the conflict and resettled temporarily in the southwestern United States to record their sixth album, Emmaar produced by Patrick Vo Tan, with guests including Josh Klinghoffer, Fats Kaplin, Matt Sweeney, and Saul Williams. Recording took place at Joshua Tree National Park in California, which features a desert environment similar to that of Tinariwen's homeland. Emmaar was released worldwide in February 2014. Tinariwen then embarked on a tour of Europe and North America, but without group leader Ibrahim Ag Alhabib, who decided to remain in Mali to attend to family issues caused by the latest political crisis. Bassist Eyadou Ag Leche assumed the role of musical director, and a new singer/guitarist named Iyad Abderrahmane was recruited to perform Ag Alhabib's parts during the tour.

In 2016, the group returned to Joshua Tree National Park and spent few days at Rancho De La Luna to record part of their seventh album, Elwan, with additional recording in France and a two-week session in a town called M'Hamid El Ghizlane in southern Morocco, an oasis very near the Algerian border and home to its own Saharan music and cultural festival, the Festival Taragalte. The album was released in February 2017 and features guest appearances by Matt Sweeney, Kurt Vile, Mark Lanegan, and Alain Johannes. Tinariwen then embarked on an American tour with Dengue Fever as support. The group also toured Europe and Asia in 2017, and toured Australia, New Zealand, and North America in 2018. They played at WOMADelaide in March 2018.

Upon returning from the international tour in support of Elwan in 2018, Tinariwen were unable to return to their home area in northern Mali due to ongoing sectarian violence and threats from Islamist militants. The group instead decamped in Morocco and embarked on a multi-month journey through Western Sahara and Mauritania, collaborating with local musicians at several stops along the way and writing songs while camped out in the desert.

Their eighth full-length album, Amadjar, was recorded outdoors with mobile equipment near Nouakchott and was released on 6 September 2019. Amadjar features guest appearances by Noura Mint Seymali, Micah Nelson, Cass McCombs, Stephen O'Malley, Warren Ellis, and Rodolphe Burger. In 2022, Tinariwen began a project to reissue several of their earlier albums in new formats. The first such release was the album Kel Tinariwen, which was issued in late 2022 and collects several of the group's early recordings from the early 1990s.

Musical style and influence
The Tinariwen sound is primarily guitar-driven, in the style known as assouf among the Tuareg people. The Tinariwen guitar style has its roots in West African music and other traditional styles practiced by the Tuareg and Berber peoples, and has often been categorized as "desert blues". Tinariwen was also influenced by traditional Malian musicians, most notably Ali Farka Touré, and regional pop singers like Rabah Driassa. While the Tinariwen style is possibly a distant relative of blues music, via West African music, members of Tinariwen claim to have never heard actual American blues music until they began to travel internationally in the early 2000s. Tinariwen was also influenced by American and British rock bands whose bootlegged albums had made it to the Sahara region, such as Dire Straits, Santana, Led Zeppelin, Bob Dylan, and Jimi Hendrix.

Tinariwen has been named as a formative influence on a growing Tuareg rock scene, made up of younger musicians who were not rebels like the members of Tinariwen but have experienced their region's recent struggles with poverty and terrorism. The band Imarhan is led by Sadam Iyad Moussa Ben Abderamane, who has collaborated with Tinariwen and is the nephew of longtime Tinariwen bassist Eyadu ag Leche. Kel Assouf and Tamikrest have also gained notice as younger Tuareg rock bands that cite Tinariwen as a fundamental influence.

The band Terakaft was formed by various musicians who had played with Tinariwen, and included guitarist and band leader Sanou Ag Ahmed, Tinariwen guitarist Liya Ag Ablil (Diarra), djembe player Souleymane Kane, calabash player Alpha Ousmane (Hama) Sankare, and electric bass guitar player Andrew Anwin Sudhibhaslip. They performed as part of the "Caravane culturelle de la paix" travelling festival, along with the Ali Farka Touré Band, at the Grace Rainey Rogers Auditorium at the Metropolitan Museum of Art in New York City in 2017.

Band members

Tinariwen is a collective of singers, songwriters, and musicians who come together in different combinations to play concerts and to record. This is because of the nomadic lifestyle of the Tuareg people and the difficulties of transportation and communication in the Sahara region. The group has never brought exactly the same line-up on its international tours, though several members tour regularly.

One of the group's founder members, Inteyeden Ag Ablil (brother of guitarist Liya Ag Ablil) died of a virus in the desert in 1994, and singer Wonou Walet Oumar died of a kidney infection in 2005. Mohamed Ag Itlale (aka "Japonais") died on 14 February 2021 from a heart attack.

Active touring members

 Ibrahim Ag Alhabib – guitar, vocals (founding member) 
 Alhassane Ag Touhami – guitar, vocals (founding member)
 Abdallah Ag Alhousseyni – acoustic guitar, guitar, vocals
 Eyadou Ag Leche – bass guitar, acoustic guitar, calabash, vocals, backing vocals
 Said Ag Ayad – percussion, backing vocals
 Elaga Ag Hamid – guitar, backing vocals

Non-touring or previous members
Founding brothers
 Inteyeden Ag Ablil (died 1994) – guitar, vocals
 Liya Ag Ablil ("Diarra") – rhythm guitar, vocals

Other members

 Abdallah Ag Lamida ("Intidao") – guitar, backing vocals
 Mohammed Ag Tahada – percussion
 Iyad Moussa Abderrahmane – guitar, vocals
 Mohammed Ag Itlale (aka "Japonais") (died 2021) – guitar, vocals
 Kedou Ag Ossad – guitar, vocals
 Sweiloum – guitar, vocals
 Foy Foy – guitar, vocals
 Abouhadid – guitar, vocals
 Wonou Walet Sidati – vocals
 Kesa Malet Hamid – vocals
 Mina Walet Oumar – vocals
 Wonou Walet Oumar (died 2005) – vocals

Awards
 In 2012 Tinariwen won Best Group at the Songlines Music Awards.
 In 2012 Tassili won the Grammy Award for Best World Music Album.
In 2017 Elwan was nominated for the Grammy Award for the best Best World Music Album.
 In 2020 Amadjar was nominated for the Grammy Award for the best Best Global Music Album.
 In 2020 Amadjar won the Libera Award for best world music album.

Discography

Studio albums

Compilations
Kel Tinariwen (2022)

Others

Contributing artist
 The Rough Guide to Desert Blues (2010)
 The Imagine Project – Herbie Hancock (2010) ("Tamatant Tilay/Exodus" with K'naan and Los Lobos)

References

External links

 Official Tinariwen site

Malian musical groups
Tuareg culture
Wrasse Records artists
Berber music
Grammy Award winners
Outside Music albums
Independiente Records artists
Algerian music
Desert blues
1979 establishments in Algeria
Musical collectives
Political music groups